Mr. and Mrs. Pennington is a 1931 novel by the British writer Francis Brett Young. It portrays the courtship and first year of marriage a couple, and as with many of Young's Mercian novels takes place in North Bromwich and other settings.

References

Bibliography
 Michael Hall. Francis Brett Young. Seren, 1997.

1931 British novels
Novels by Francis Brett Young
Novels set in England
Heinemann (publisher) books